In applied mathematics, symlet wavelets are a family of wavelets. They are a modified version of Daubechies wavelets with increased symmetry.

References 

Wavelets